Lennart Persson (born: 20 June 1958) is a sailor from Stockholm, Sweden, who represented his country at the 1988 Summer Olympics in Busan, South Korea as helmsman in the Soling. With crew members Eje Öberg and Tony Wallin they took the 8th place.

References

Living people
1958 births
Sailors at the 1988 Summer Olympics – Soling
Olympic sailors of Sweden
Swedish male sailors (sport)
Sportspeople from Stockholm